Jemal, Djemal or Dzhemal (Georgian: ჯემალ, (Arabic: جمل) may refer to the following notable people:

Given name
Jemal Azmi (1868–1922), Ottoman politician
Jemal Gokieli (1920–1991), Georgian conductor
Jemal Gubaz (born 1968), football player from Abkhazia
Jemal Inaishvili, the Deputy Chairman of the Parliament of Georgia
Jemal Johnson (born 1985), American-English football player
Dzhemal Kherhadze (1945–2019), Georgian football player and coach
Jemal Kurshubadze (born 1997), Belarusian football player
Jemal Gamakharia (born 1949), Georgian politician
Dzhemal Kyzylatesh (born 1994), Turkish-born Ukrainian football midfielder
Djemal Pasha (1872–1922), mayor of Istanbul
Jemal Singleton (born 1975), American football coach
Jemal Tabidze (born 1996), Georgian football player
Jemal Zeinklishvili (1937–2011), Georgian football player
Jemal Zeinklishvili Stadium, multi-use stadium in Borjomi, Georgia

Surname
Ahmedin Jemal, American cancer epidemiologist
Ali Jemal (born 1990), Tunisian football goalkeeper
Ammar Jemal (born 1987), Tunisian football player who, is playing for Etoile du Sahel
Douglas Jemal (born 1942), American real estate developer
Geydar Dzhemal (1947–2016), Russian Islamic public figure, activist, philosopher and poet

See also
Jamal